Nanubhai is an Indian given name. Notable people with the name include:

 Nanubhai Patel (1905–?), Indian politician
 Nanubhai Vanani (born 1956), Indian politician
 Nanubhai Vakil (1902–1980), Indian film director

Indian given names
Gujarati given names